Melmuri or Melmuri Junction is a town in Malappuram city in the state of Kerala, India. It's located on NH 966 towards Calicut Road. Today it is one of the residential as well as education zone of the city.

Demographics
, Melmuri had a population of 18,737, of which 9,012 were males and 9,725 females.

Notable landmarks
 Alathurpadi Dars
 Konompara
 Juma masjid
 Grand Masjid
 PMR Auditorium
 PM Arcade
 Malappuram service cooperative bank melmuri
 Melmuri 27

References

Suburbs of Malappuram